The following is an alphabetical list of topics related to the Argentina.

0–9

.ar – Internet country code top-level domain for Argentina
1861 Mendoza earthquake
1863 Jujuy earthquake
1888 Río de la Plata earthquake
1892 Recreo earthquake
1928 Argentina general elections
1931 Argentina general elections
1944 San Juan earthquake
1946 Argentina general elections
1949 Tierra del Fuego earthquake
1951 Argentina general elections
1958 Argentina general elections
1963 Argentina general elections
1973 Argentina general elections (March)
1973 Argentina general elections (September)
1977 San Juan earthquake
1978 FIFA World Cup
1982 invasion of the Falkland Islands
1983 Argentina general elections
1989 attack on La Tablada Regiment
1989 Argentina general elections
1992 Israeli Embassy attack in Buenos Aires
1994 AMIA bombing
1995 Argentina general elections
1999 Argentina general elections
2001 FIFA World Youth Championship
2001 riots
2003 Argentina general elections
2004 Argentine energy crisis
2006 Argentine nuclear reactivation plan
2007 Argentina general elections
2008 Argentine government conflict with the agricultural sector
2011 Flores rail crash
2011 Argentina general elections
2015 Argentina general elections
2019 Argentina general elections
2da Escuadrilla Aeronaval de Caza y Ataque
5th Naval Infantry Battalion (Argentina)
6, 7, 8
601 Air Assault Regiment
601 Assault Helicopter Battalion
601 Commando Company
602 Commando Company
7th Infantry Regiment (Argentina)
8th Chess Olympiad

A

A King and His Movie
A-4AR Fightinghawk
Abaddón el exterminador
Abel Bazán
Abel Ernesto Herrera
Abel Masuero
Abelardo Castillo
Abipón people
Abipón language
Abuelas de Plaza de Mayo
Aconcagua – highest mountain summit in Argentina, the Americas, the Western Hemisphere, and the Southern Hemisphere
Action of Tambo Nuevo
Adán Buenosayres
Adolfo Alsina
Adolfo Aristarain
Adolfo Bellocq
Adolfo Bioy Casares
Adolfo Cambiaso
Adolfo Carranza
Adolfo Rodríguez Saá
Adolfo Pérez Esquivel
Adolfo Saldías
Adrián Suar
Aerochaco
Aerolíneas Argentinas
Aerolíneas Argentinas destinations
Afro Argentine
Agriculture in Argentina
Agrupación Aérea Presidencial
Agustín Calleri
Agustín P. Justo
Agustín Pichot
Agustín Tosco
Agustina Cherri
Aero VIP
Aimogasta
Alberto Argibay
Alberto Castillo
Alberto Calderón
Alberto Cortez
Alberto de Mendoza
Alberto Fernández de Rosa
Alberto Gerchunoff
Alberto Ginastera
Alberto Olmedo
Alberto Prebisch
Alberto Tarantini
Alberto Vaccarezza
Aldo Duscher
Alejandra Boero
Alejandra Pizarnik
Alejandro Agustín Lanusse
Alejandro Awada
Alejandro Bustillo
Alejandro Doria
Alejandro Dolina
Alejandro Gómez
Alejandro Lerner
Alejandro Mancuso
Alejandro Romay
Alejandro Sokol
Alejandro Spajic
Alejo Carmen Guzmán
Alejo Castex
Alejo Peyret
Alfajor
Alfonsina Storni
Alfredo Astiz
Alfredo Avelín
Alfredo Casero
Alfredo de Angeli
Alfredo Di Stéfano
Alfredo Palacios
Alfredo Yabrán
Alicia Bruzzo
Alicia Moreau de Justo
All Boys
Almafuerte
Almendra
Almirante Brown Partido
Almirante Marco Andrés Zar Airport
Alta Gracia
Altamirano, Buenos Aires
Aluminé Department
Alvarado de Mar del Plata
Alvaro Alsogaray
Álvaro Melián Lafinur
Amadeo Carrizo
Amadeo Sabattini
Amancio Williams
Ambito Financiero
Amelita Baltar
América (town)
Americas
South America
South Atlantic Ocean
Islands of Argentina
Isla Grande de Tierra del Fuego
Estrecho de Magallanes (Strait of Magellan)
Golfo San Jorge
Golfo San Matías
Mar de Hoces (Drake Passage)
Mar del Scotia (Scotia Sea)
Rio de la Plata
Américo Ghioldi
Ana María Campoy
Andes Líneas Aéreas
Andrea del Boca
Andrés Calamaro
Andrés D'Alessandro
Andrés Nocioni
Andrés Oppenheimer
Andrés Rivera
Añelo Department
Añatuya
Ángel Borlenghi
Ángel Cabrera
Ángel Labruna
Ángel Cappa
Anglo-French blockade of the Río de la Plata
Aníbal Fernández
Angélica Gorodischer
Aníbal Gordon
Aníbal Ibarra
Aníbal Troilo
Antarctic Treaty System
Antarctica
Antofagasta de la Sierra (village)
Antofalla
Antonio Álvarez Jonte
Antonio Beruti
Antonio Cafiero
Antonio Piergüidi
Antonio Quarracino
Apagón
ARA Almirante Irízar
ARA Almirante Domecq Garcia (D23)
ARA Bahía Buen Suceso
ARA Bahía San Blas (B-4)
ARA Buenos Aires (D-6)
ARA Cabo San Antonio (Q42)
ARA Comodoro Rivadavia (Q-11)
ARA Comodoro Somellera (A-10)
ARA Ciudad de Rosario (Q-62)
ARA Drummond (P-31)
ARA General Belgrano
ARA Guerrico (P-32)
ARA Hércules (B-52)
ARA Hércules (P-31)
ARA Heroína (P-32)
ARA Irigoyen (A-1)
ARA Isla de los Estados
ARA Juan B. Azopardo (GC-11)
ARA Libertad (Q-2)
ARA Moreno
ARA Paraná (1873)
ARA Patagonia (B-1)
ARA Presidente Sarmiento
ARA Puerto Deseado (Q-20)
ARA Rivadavia

ARA Santísima Trinidad
ARA Sarandí (P-33)
ARA Suboficial Castillo (A-6)
ARA Teniente Olivieri (A-2)
ARA Uruguay
ARA Veinticinco de Mayo (V-2)
Aracar
Araceli González
Araucanization
Arequito Revolt
Arequito, Santa Fe
Arena Obras Sanitarias
Argentina and England football rivalry
Cisplatine War
Argentina national basketball team
Argentina national cricket team
Argentina Olympic football team
Argentina Wine Route
Argentina
Argentina Centennial
Argentina Bicentennial
Argentina - Chile Relations
Argentina Sono Film
Argentine actions in Antarctica
Argentine Air Force
Argentine Air Force Mobile Field Hospital
Argentine air forces in the Falklands War
Argentine Army
Argentine Army Aviation
Argentine comics
Argentine Declaration of Independence
Argentine defense industry
Argentine Federal Police
Argentine Great Western Railway
Argentine ground forces in the Falklands War
Argentine Hydrographic Service
Argentine literature
Argentine Military Cemetery
Argentine Marines
Argentine National Anthem
Argentine Naval Aviation
Argentine naval forces in the Falklands War
Argentine Naval Prefecture
Argentine Navy
Argentine North Eastern Railway
Argentine postal code
Argentine Republic (República Argentina)
Argentine Regional Workers' Federation
Argentine rock
Argentine Sea
Argentine Submarine Force
Argentine University Federation
Argentine War of Independence
Argentine wine
Argentine Workers' Central Union
Argentinos Juniors
Ariel Broggi
Ariel Ramírez
Aristóbulo del Valle
Armstrong
Army of the Andes
Army of the North
Arroyo del Medio
Arroyo Seco
Arturo Carrera
Arturo Frondizi
Arturo Jauretche
Arturo Maly
Arturo Rawson
Arturo S. Mom
Arturo Umberto Illia
Ástor Piazzolla
Atahualpa Yupanqui
Atlantic Ocean
Atlético Rafaela
Atlas of Argentina
Atrapadas
Atucha I nuclear power plant
Atucha II nuclear power plant
Autogestión Liberadora Buenos Aires
Austral University
Autonomist Party of Corrientes
Avellaneda
Avenida General Paz
Ayacucho Department, San Luis
Azucena Villaflor
Azul Partido
Azul

B

Bahía Blanca
Bahía Blanca and North Western Railway
Bailoretto, la aventura de un rebelde
Balcarce
Ballester–Molina
Baltasar Hidalgo de Cisneros
Bariloche
Barón von Holmberg
Barranca Yaco
Bartolomé Mitre
Base Aérea Teniente Benjamín Matienzo
Basilio Lami Dozo
Battle of Ayohuma
Battle of Caaguazú
Battle of Caseros
Battle of Cepeda
Battle of Cepeda (1820)
Battle of Cepeda (1859)
Battle of Chacabuco
Battle of Cotagaita
Battle of Curupaity
Battle of Goose Green
Battle of Famaillá
Battle of Huaqui
Battle of Ituzaingo
Battle of Juncal
Battle of la Tablada de Tolomosa
Battle of Martín García (1814)
Battle of Márquez Bridge
Battle of Monte Santiago
Battle of Mount Harriet
Battle of Mount Longdon
Battle of Mount Tumbledown
Battle of Pavón
Battle of Pequereque
Battle of Riachuelo
Battle of Salta
Battle of San Carlos (1982)
Battle of San Lorenzo
Battle of San Nicolás
Battle of San Roque
Battle of Seal Cove
Battle of Sipe-Sipe
Battle of Suipacha
Battle of Tacuarí
Battle of The Tonelero Pass
Battle of Top Malo House
Battle of Tucumán
Battle of Vilcapugio
Battle of Vuelta de Obligado
Battle of Wireless Ridge
Battle of Yavi
Beagle Channel
Belgranian National Institute
Belgrano Cargas
Belgrano Day School
Belgrano de Córdoba
Belgrano Department, San Luis
Belgrano II Base
Beatriz Guido
Beatriz Sarlo
Bell Ville
Benito Quinquela Martín
Benito Lynch
Benito Urteaga
Berazategui Partido
Berazategui
Berisso
Bernal, Argentina
Bernardino Rivadavia
Bernardo Houssay
Bernardo Verbitsky
Bluff Cove Air Attacks
Boedo
Bomarzo
Bombing of Plaza de Mayo
Boogie, el aceitoso
Bora Milutinović
Boulogne Sur Mer, Buenos Aires
Bouquet, Santa Fe
Brandsen Partido
Brandsen
British investment in Argentina
Buenos Aires – Capital of Argentina
Buenos Aires and Ensenada Port Railway
Buenos Aires class destroyer
Buenos Aires Herald
Buenos Aires Metro
Buenos Aires Northern Railway
Buenos Aires Province
Buenos Aires–Rosario–Córdoba high-speed railway

C

Cabildo
Cabo Corrientes, Mar del Plata
Cachi, Argentina
Cachi Department
Cafayate
Cafayate Department
Cafferatta, Santa Fe
Calafate
Calamuchita Department
Caleta Olivia
Calchaquí Valleys
Calfucurá
Calixto Oyuela
Calquín (aircraft)
Camarones
Camila (film)
Camino de los chilenos
Campana
Campo del Cielo crater
Canal 5 Noticias
Canal 7 Argentina
Candelaria Molfese
Cañada de Gómez
Cañadón Seco
Cañuelas Pact
Cape San Antonio
Cape Virgenes
Capital of Argentina:  Buenos Aires
Carancho (film)
Carapintadas
Carcarañá River
CAREM
Carhué
Carlos Bianchi
Carlos Delcio Funes
Carlos Delfino
Carlos Espínola
Carlos Fayt
Carlos Gardel
Carlos Guastavino
Carlos Heller
Carlos Kletnicki
Carlos Monzón
Carlos Mugica
Carlos Pachamé
Carlos Pellegrini
Carlos Reutemann
Carlos Ruckauf
Carlos Saavedra Lamas
Carlos Salvador Bilardo
Carlos Serrey
Carlos Sorín
Carlos Thays
Carlos Timoteo Griguol
Carlos Torres Ríos
Carlos Trillo
Carmen Argibay
Carolina Ardohain
Casa Rosada
Catamarca Popular Movement
Catán Lil Department
Categories:
:Category:Argentina
:Category:Argentina stubs
:Category:Argentina-related lists
:Category:Argentine culture
:Category:Argentine people
:Category:Buildings and structures in Argentina
:Category:Churches in Argentina
:Category:Communications in Argentina
:Category:Economy of Argentina
:Category:Ecoregions of Argentina
:Category:Education in Argentina
:Category:Environment of Argentina
:Category:Geography of Argentina
:Category:Government of Argentina
:Category:Health in Argentina
:Category:High schools in Argentina
:Category:History of Argentina
:Category:Images of Argentina
:Category:Law of Argentina
:Category:Military of Argentina
:Category:Politics of Argentina
:Category:Science and technology in Argentina
:Category:Shipyards of Argentina
:Category:Society of Argentina
:Category:Sport in Argentina
:Category:Transportation in Argentina
commons:Category:Argentina
Causes of the May Revolution
Caucete
Cecilia Rognoni
Cecilia Roth
Ceferino Namuncurá
Ceibo
Celeste Cid
CELPA (El Chamical)
CELPA (Mar Chiquita)
Cementerio Británico
Central Argentine Railway
Central Ballester
Central Bank of Argentina
Central Chubut Railway
Centro Popular de la Memoria
Ceres
Cerrillos Department
Cerrillos, Salta
Cerro Bayo
Cerro Catedral
Cerro Chaltén
Cerro Escorial
Cerros Colorados Complex
Cerveza Quilmes
César Aira
César Isella
César Luis Menotti
César Milstein
César Pelli
CGT de los Argentinos
Chacabuco, Buenos Aires
Chacabuco Department, Chaco
Chacabuco Department, San Luis
Chacabuco Partido
Chacarita Cemetery
Chacarita Juniors
Cha Cha Cha (TV series)
Chalía River
Chamamé
Chapel of Santisima Virgen de Lujan, Antarctica
Charata
Charly García
Chascomús
Chicoana Department
Chimichurri
Chimpay
Chiriguano
Choele Choel
Chos Malal Department
Christian Basso
Christian Cellay
Christian Diaz
Chubut Province
Chubut River
Cielos Argentinos
Cipolletti
City Bell
Ciudad Perico
Clarín (Argentine newspaper)
Claudio Caniggia
Claypole, Buenos Aires
Clorinda, Formosa
Clorindo Testa
Club Atlético Aldosivi
Club Atlético Boca Juniors
Club Atlético Central Córdoba
Club Atlético Huracán
Club Atlético Independiente
Club Atlético Lanús
Club Atlético Nueva Chicago
Club Atlético Platense
Club Atlético River Plate
Club Atlético Sarmiento
Club Social y Deportivo Defensa y Justicia
Club Atlético Vélez Sársfield
Club de Pescadores
Club Hotel de la Ventana
Coat of arms of Argentina

Colegiales
Colegio Militar de la Nación
Colegio Nacional de Buenos Aires
Colla people
Colón de Santa Fe
Colón, Entre Ríos
Colonia Sarmiento
Collón Curá Department
Color Humano
Comahue
Comechingón
Comisión Nacional de Actividades Espaciales (CONAE)
Comodoro Rivadavia
Communist Party of Argentina
Concepción del Uruguay
Concordia
Confitería El Molino
Confluencia Department
Congress of Tucumán
Congressional Plaza
Conquest of the Desert
Conrado Nalé Roxlo
Conrado Villegas
Conservatorio Nacional Superior de Música (Argentina)
Copahue
Corbeta Uruguay Base
Córdoba & Rosario Railway
Córdoba Central Railway
Córdoba Metro
Córdoba North Western Railway
Córdoba Province
Córdoba
Cordobazo
Cornelio Saavedra
Coronda
Coronel Pringles Department, San Luis
Coronel Pringles Partido
Coronel Pringles
Coronel Suárez
Corralito
Corrientes Province
Corrientes
Cosquín
Cosquín Festival
Cosme Argerich
COVID-19 pandemic in Argentina
Crespo
Cris Morena
Cristian Lucchetti
Cristian Piarrou
Cristina Cremer de Busti
Cristina Fernández de Kirchner
Crossing of the Andes
Cruz del Eje
Cueva de las Manos
Cuisine of Argentina
Culture of Argentina
Curuzú Cuatiá
Cutral Có
Cuyo

D

Dago (comics)
Dagmar Ingrid Hagelin
Daireaux
Dakar Rally
Dalmacio Vélez Sársfield
Dan Jacobo Beninson
Daniel Alberto Passarella
Daniel Bertoni
Daniel Barenboim
Daniel Burman
Daniel Melingo
Daniel Pérsico
Daniel Rabinovich
Daniel Romero
Daniel Scioli
Daniel Tinayre
Dante Caputo
Dante Quinterno
Darío Cvitanich
Dario Grandinetti
Dario Vittori
David Nalbandián
Dark River (1952 film)
Defensores de Belgrano
Deportivo Madryn
Deportivo Santamarina
Diana Bellessi
Diana Taurasi
Diego Albanese
Diego Cagna
Diego Capusotto
Diego Herner
Diego Maradona
Diego Milito
Diego Ramos
Diego Torres (singer)
Digital Divide in Argentina
Dirty War
Dolfines Guaraní
Dolores
Domingo Cullen
Domingo Faustino Sarmiento
Domingo French
Domingo Liotta
Domingo Matheu
Dominic Miller
Domuyo
Don Segundo Sombra
Don Segundo Sombra (film)
Dora Baret
Dorismar
Duilio Marzio
Dulce River
Drake Passage

E

East Argentine Railway
Edelmiro Farrell
Edgardo Gabriel Storni
Eduard Ladislas Kaunitz, baron von Holmberg
Eduardo Fellner
Eduardo Camaño
Eduardo Castex
Eduardo Duhalde
Eduardo González Lanuza
Eduardo Gudiño Kieffer
Eduardo Falú
Eduardo Lonardi
Eduardo Gutiérrez
Eduardo Mac Entyre
Eduardo Macaluse
Eduardo Madero
Eduardo Mallea
Eduardo Menem
Eduardo Newbery
Eduardo Rabossi
Eduardo Schiaffino
Eduardo Tuzzio
Ejército Grande
Ejército Revolucionario del Pueblo
Eladia Blázquez
El Aleph
El Ateneo Grand Splendid
El Bolsón
El Chaltén
El Chocón Dam
El Exilio de Gardel
El Día (La Plata)
Electricity sector in Argentina
El Gen Argentino
El Maitén
Elections in Argentina, 2005
Elena Corregido
Elena Highton de Nolasco
El Eternauta
Elías Gómez (footballer, born 1986)
Elías Gómez (footballer, born 1994)
Elisa Carrió
El derecho de matar
El Linqueño
Elpidio González
El Túnel
El Turbio
El Último perro
El último virrey
Ellsworth Station
Embalse Nuclear Power Station
Embraer/FMA CBA 123 Vector
Emilio Eduardo Massera
Emilio Kauderer
Emilio Vieyra
Emmanuel Martínez
Empanada
Empresa Líneas Marítimas Argentinas (ELMA)
Encarnación Ezcurra
Encuentro y Fiesta Nacional de Colectividades
Enrique Banchs
Enrique Cadícamo
Enrique Cahen Salaberry
Enrique de Gandía
Enrique Martínez
Enrique Mosconi
Enrique Pinti
Enrique Santiago Petracchi
Enrique Tornú
Ensenada
Entre Ríos (band)
Entre Ríos Railway
Entre Ríos
Enzo Bordabehere
Epuyén
Equestrian monument to General Manuel Belgrano
Eric Calcagno
Erik Lamela
Ernestina Herrera de Noble
Ernesto Acher
Ernesto Horacio Crespo
Ernesto Sabato
Ernesto Tornquist
Ernie Pike
Escuadrón Fénix
Escuela Superior de Comercio Carlos Pellegrini
ESMA
Esquel
Estación Puente Alsina
Estadio Alberto J. Armando
Estadio Diego Armando Maradona
Estadio José Amalfitani
Estadio Monumental Antonio Vespucio Liberti
Estadio Raúl Conti
Estanislao López
Esteban Cambiasso
Esteban Echeverría
Esteban Gonnet
Esther Goris
Esther Norma Arrostito
Estrecho de Magallanes
Estudiantes de la Plata
Ethnography of Argentina
Ettore Panizza
Eustaquio Díaz Vélez
Eva Perón
Evaristo Carriego
Exposición Internacional del Centenario (1910)
Extraña invasión
Ezeiza airport
Ezequiel Martínez Estrada
Ezequiel Rodríguez (actor)
Ezequiel Rodríguez (footballer, born 1980)
Ezequiel Rodríguez (footballer, born 1990)
Ezequiel Rodríguez (footballer, born 1996)
Ezra Winston

F

Fabián Bielinsky
Juan Pablo Carrizo
Fabiana Cantilo
Fábrica de Aviones Córdoba
Fabricio Oberto
Facundo
Facundo Arana
Facundo Cabral
Facundo Gambandé
Falucho
Fatima Massacre
Fernando de Magallanes
Fernando Demaría
Fernando Fader
Falklands War
Federación
Federación de Obreros y Empleados Ferroviarios
Federación de Sindicatos Ferroviarios
Federalism
Federico de Brandsen
Federico Luppi
Feliciano Chiclana
Felipe Contepomi
Felipe Sapag
Felipe Solá
Felisa Miceli
Félix Aguilar Observatory
Félix de la Peña
Félix Luna
FEMESA
Fernando Cavenaghi
Fernando Pino Solanas
Fernando Zylberberg
Ferrocarril Andino
Ferrocarril Argentino del Norte
Ferrocarril Buenos Aires al Pacífico
Ferrocarril Central de Buenos Aires
Ferrocarril Central Entrerriano
Ferrocarril Central Norte
Ferrocarril Compañía General de Buenos Aires
Ferrocarril Córdoba Central
Ferrocarril de San Cristóbal a Tucumán
Ferrocarril Domingo Faustino Sarmiento
Ferrocarril General Bartolomé Mitre
Ferrocarril General Manuel Belgrano
Ferrocarril General Roca
Ferrocarril General San Martín
Ferrocarril General Urquiza
Ferrocarril Midland de Buenos Aires
Ferrocarril Oeste de Buenos Aires
Ferrocarril Provincial de Buenos Aires
Ferrocarril Provincial de Santa Fe
Ferrocarriles Mediterráneos
Ferrocarriles Patagónicos
Ferroexpreso Pampeano
Ferrosur Roca
Festival Iberoamericano de Publicidad
Fibertel
Fierro (film)
Fiesta Nacional de la Vendimia
Fito Páez
Flag of Argentina

Flag of Macha
Florencia De La V
Florencio Randazzo
Florencia Peña
Florencio Varela
Florentino Ameghino
Floridablanca (Patagonia)
Florida group
FMA AeMB.2
Football in Argentina
Football World Cup 1978 (squads)
Ford Falcon
Foreign relations of Argentina
Formosa Province
Francesco Tamburini
Francisco Álvarez (actor)
Francisco de Narváez
Francisco Gianotti
Francisco Macri
Francisco Moreno
Francisco Petrone
Francisco Ramírez (governor)
Francisco Salamone
Francisco Seeber
Francisco Urondo
Francisco Varallo
Franco Squillari
Fray Mocho
French blockade of the Río de la Plata
Frente de Liberación Homosexual
Froilán González
Fundación Favaloro
Funes, a Great Love
Funes the Memorious
Futaleufú River

G

Gabino Ezeiza
Gabino Coria Peñaloza
Gabriel Batistuta
Gabriela Sabatini
GADA 601
Gaiman
Galerías Pacífico
Gan Gan
Gastón Gaudio
Gastón Monzon
Gastón Needleman
Gastre
Gaturro
Gaucho
Gaucho literature
Gendarmería Nacional Argentina
General Acha
General Baldissera
General Belgrano, Buenos Aires
General Güemes Department, Salta
General Juan Madariaga
General Mosconi
General Pedernera Department
General Pico
General San Martín
General San Martín Park
Geography of Argentina
Georgina Bardach
Gerardo Sofovich
Gervasio Antonio de Posadas
Gilda (Argentine singer)
Gimnasia y Esgrima de La Plata
Ginés González García
Gisela Dulko
Glew, Buenos Aires
Gobernador Dupuy Department, San Luis
Gobernador Gregores
God Reward You
Gómez, Buenos Aires
Governorate of the Río de la Plata
Goya
Graciela Ocaña
Gran Chaco
Gran Ferrocarril Sur
Granaderos a caballo
Greater Buenos Aires
Greater Mendoza
Gregorio Aráoz de Lamadrid
Gringo-Gaucho
Grupo Clarin
Guachipas Department
Gualeguay
Gualeguay River
Gualeguaychú
Gualeguaychú River
Guaraní Aquifer
Guaraní language
Guatraché
Guaymallén
Guido di Tella
Guido Kaczka
Guillermo Coria
Guillermo Francella
Guillermo Moreno
Guillermo Rawson
Guillermo Roux
Guillermo Vargas Aignasse
Guillermo Vilas
Gustavo Cerati
Guy Williams

H

H. Bustos Domecq
Hands of Perón
Haroldo Conti
Haydée Tamara Bunke Bider
Hebe de Bonafini
Héctor Alterio
Héctor Babenco
Héctor Bidonde
Héctor Germán Oesterheld
Héctor Icazuriaga
Héctor José Cámpora
Héctor Magnetto
Héctor Olivera
Héctor Pellegrini
Henderson
Hermenegildo Sábat
Hermes Binner
Hermética
Hernan Cattaneo
Hernán Crespo
High Monte
Hijitus
Hilario Ascasubi
Hilario Fernández Long
Hilda Lizarazu
Hipólito Bouchard
Hipólito Vieytes
Hipólito Yrigoyen
History of Mar del Plata
History of Rosario
Homero Cárpena
Homero Manzi
Hopscotch (Julio Cortázar novel)
Horacio Altuna
Horacio Massaccesi
Horacio Salgán
Horacio Vaggione
Horacio Zeballos
Hospital de Emergencias Clemente Álvarez
House of Tucumán
Huanquero
Huemul Project
Hugo Benjamín Ibarra
Hugo Corro
Hugo Fregonese
Hugo Porta
Hugo Sofovich
Human rights in Argentina
Humid Chaco
Huiliches Department
Huracán de Tres Arroyos
Hurlingham

I

IAE Universidad Austral
I.Ae. 31 Colibrí
IAI Dagger
IAME Justicialista
IAME Rastrojero
IAME Rastrojero Conosur
Iberá National Park
Iberá Provincial Reserve
Iberá Wetlands
Ignacio Warnes
Iguazú Falls
Iguazú National Park
Iguazú river
Incahuasi
Imagining Argentina (film)
Immigration to Argentina
Independiente Rivadavia
Independiente de Bigand
Industrias Aeronáuticas y Mecánicas del Estado
Inés Arrondo
Inés Mónica Weinberg de Roca
Inés Rivero
Infamous Decade
Ingeniero Jacobacci
Instituto Antartico Argentino
Instituto Argentino de Normalización y Certificación
Instituto Atlético Central Córdoba
Instituto de Automática
Instituto de Biología y Medicina Experimental
Instituto Jorge A. Sábato
Instituto Nacional de Tecnología Agropecuaria
International Organization for Standardization (ISO)
Invasión (film)
Invasion of South Georgia
Invisible
ISO 3166-1 alpha-2 country code for Argentina: AR
ISO 3166-1 alpha-3 country code for Argentina: ARG
ISO 3166-2:AR region codes for Argentina
Integration and Development Movement
International rankings of Argentina
Isabel Perón
Ischigualasto
Isidoro Cañones
Isidro Casanova
Islands of Argentina:
Isla Apipé
Isla de los Estados
Isla Grande de Tierra del Fuego
Isla Huemul
Islas Ibicuy
Isla Martín García
Ítalo Argentino Lúder
Ituzaingó

J

Jáchal River
Jacinto Aráuz
Jacobo Fijman
Jacobo Timmerman
Javier Mascherano
Javier Portales
Javier Zanetti
Jeppener, Buenos Aires
Jeremías Caggiano
John Joseph Jolly Kyle
Jonathan Chávez
Jordán Bruno Genta
Jorge Antonio
Jorge Bontemps
Jorge Burruchaga
Jorge Carrascosa
Jorge Castro (boxer)
Jorge Donn
Jorge Enea Spilimbergo
Jorge Lanata
Jorge Luis Borges
Jorge Mario Bergoglio
Jorge Newbery
Jorge Obeid
Jorge Porcel
Jorge Rafael Videla
Jorge Recalde
Jorge Rial
Jorge Sábato
José Alonso (trade unionist)
José Amalfitani
José Antonio Balseiro
José C. Paz
José Cibrián
José Cura
José de San Martín
José Evaristo Uriburu
José Figueroa Alcorta
José Hernández (writer)
José Ignacio García Hamilton
José López Rega
José Luis Cabezas
José Luis Clerc
José Luis Murature
José Luis Zavalía
José María Guido
José Manuel Moreno
José María Paz
José Mármol
José Marrone
José Neglia
José Nicolás Matienzo
José Octavio Bordón
José Pekerman
Juan Agustín Maza
Juan Ángel Neira
Juan Antonio Buschiazzo
Juan Bautista Alberdi
Juan Bautista Azopardo
Juan Bautista Baigorria
Juan Bautista Bailoretto
Juan Bautista Cabral
Juan Bautista Justo
Juan Carlos Altavista
Juan Carlos Aramburu
Juan Carlos Baglietto
Juan Carlos Calabró
Juan Carlos Castagnino
Juan Carlos Lorenzo
Juan Carlos Maqueda
Juan Carlos Mareco
Juan Carlos Onganía
Juan Carlos Stekelman
Juan Cuevas
Juan Díaz de Solís
Juan Diego Solanas
Juan Esteban Pedernera
Juan Facundo Quiroga
Juan Gilberto Funes
Juan Gregorio de las Heras
Juan Huerta
Juan José Campanella
Juan José de Vértiz y Salcedo
Juan José López
Juan José Valle
Juan José Viamonte
Juan Larrea
Juan Luis Manzur
Juan Maldacena
Juan Manuel Blanes
Juan Manuel de Rosas
Juan Manuel Fangio
Juan Martín Coggi
Juan Martín del Potro
Juan Martín Hernández
Juan Martín de Pueyrredón
Juan Moreira
Juan Moreira (film)
Juan Moreira (novel)
Juan Pascual Pringles
Juan Perón
Juan Román Riquelme
Juan Vucetich
Juana Azurduy
Juana Molina
Juárez Celman
Jubany
Jujuy Exodus
Jujuy Province
Julián Álvarez
Julio Rodolfo Alsogaray
Julio Argentino Roca
Julio Bocca
Julio Chávez
Julio Cortázar
Julio Dormal
Julio Sosa
July 2007 Argentine winter storm
Junín
Junín Department, San Luis
Junín de los Andes

K

Karina Masotta
Kavanagh Building
Kevin Johansen
Kirchnerism
Kurt Tank

L

Laboulaye
La Capital Department, San Luis
La Carlota
La Deuda Interna
La dignidad de los nadies
La Fuga
La Guerra Gaucha (novel)
La Guerra Gaucha
La Máquina de Hacer Pájaros
La Matanza
La Nación (newspaper)
Lanín (volcano)
La Pampa Province
La Paternal
La patota (1960 film)
La Plata Astronomical Observatory
La Plata derby
La Prensa
La Republica perdida
La Republica perdida II
La Rioja, Argentina
La Rural
Lácar Department
La Carlota
La Gaceta (Tucumán)
Lago Argentino
Lago Fagnano
Lago Nahuel Huapi
Lago Puelo National Park
Lago Puelo
Laguna Blanca National Park
Laguna del Carbón – lowest point in Argentina, the Americas, the Western Hemisphere, and the Southern Hemisphere
Laguna de los Padres
Laguna Limpia
Laguna Mar Chiquita
La Historia 
Lalo Schifrin
Landmarks in Buenos Aires
Languages of Argentina
Lanín National Park
Lanús
Las Parinas
La Portuaria
La Quiaca
Las Flores
Las Leñas
Laszlo Biro
LATAM Argentina
Latin America
La Viña Department
La Voz del Interior
Leandro Alem
Leandro Desábato
León Gieco
León Klimovsky
León Najnudel
Leonardo Favio
Leopoldo Luque
Leopoldo Lugones
Leopoldo Marechal
Leopoldo Presas
Leopoldo Torre Nilsson
Leopoldo Torres Ríos
Lezama Park
LGBT in Argentina
LGBT history in Argentina
Liberal Libertarian Party
Liberal Party of Corrientes
Libertador General San Martín Department, San Luis
Lidia Elsa Satragno
Liga Federal
Lima, Buenos Aires
Limay River
Lincoln (town)
Linea Belgrano Norte
Linea Belgrano Sur
Linea Mitre
Linea Roca
Linea San Martín
Linea Sarmiento
Lino Enea Spilimbergo
Lionel Messi
Lisandro de la Torre
Lists related to Argentina:
Diplomatic missions of Argentina
El Gen Argentino
List of aircraft of Argentine Naval Aviation
List of airports in Argentina
List of Argentina-related topics
Lists of Argentines
List of Argentine Jews
List of Argentine writers
List of cars manufactured in Argentina
List of companies of Argentina
List of diplomatic missions in Argentina
List of earthquakes in Argentina
List of football clubs in Argentina
List of football stadiums in Argentina
List of Foreign Ministers of Argentina
List of German Argentines
List of heads of state of Argentina
List of hospitals in Argentina
List of indigenous languages in Argentina
List of islands of Argentina
List of lakes in Argentina
List of mammals of Argentina
List of Mapudungun placenames
List of mountains in Argentina
List of political parties in Argentina
List of ports in Argentina
List of rivers of Argentina
List of schools in Argentina
List of senior officers of the Argentine Army
List of the Golden Martín Fierro Award winners
List of town tramway systems in Argentina
Outline of Argentina
Timeline of Argentine history
Lito Vitale
Llamil Simes
Lockheed Martin Aircraft Argentina SA
Lola Mora
Lola Ponce
Loma Negra
Loma Negra de Olavarría
Lomas del Mirador
Lomas de Zamora
Lonko
Loncopué Department
Lorenzo Barcala
Lorenzo Miguel
Los Alerces National Park
Los Altares
Los Antiguos
Los Arrayanes National Park
Los Auténticos Decadentes
Los Gatos
Los Grutynos
Los Quirquinchos
Los Isleros
Los Nocheros
Los Pericos
Los Rodríguez
Los Twist
Loyalty Day
Lucas Demare
Lucas Landa
Lucho González
Luciana Aymar
Luciana Salazar
Luciano Leguizamón
Lucio Fontana
Lucrecia Martel
Luis Alberto Spinetta
Luis Agote
Luis Argentino Palau
Luis César Amadori
Luis Dellepiane
Luis Falcó
Luis Federico Leloir
Luis Felipe Noé
Luis María Mendía
Luis Palau
Luis Puenzo
Luis Scola
Luis Ureta Sáenz Peña
Luisana Lopilato
Lunfardo

M

Macanudo (comic)
Mad Toy
Mafalda
Maipo (volcano)
Malargue
Malón
Malvinas Argentinas
Manu Ginóbili
Manuel B. Gonnet
Manuel Belgrano
Manuel de Sarratea
Manuel Dorrego
Manuel Puig
Manuel Quintana
Manuel Savio
Manuel Sadosky
Manuel Vicente Maza
Manuela Pedraza
Mapuche
Mapudungun
Mar Chiquita
Mar de Hoces
Mar de Ajó
Mar del Plata
Mar del Plata Film Festival
Mar del Plata Marathon
Mar del Plata Open
Mar del Plata style
Mar del Scotia
Marcela Acuña
Marcela Kloosterboer
Marcelo Bielsa
Marcelo Loffreda
Marcelo Peralta
Marcelo Tinelli
Marcelo Torcuato de Alvear
Marcos Milinkovic
Marcos Mundstock
Marcos Pirchio
Marcos Sastre
Margarita Stolbizer
María Clara Alonso
María Cristina Cremer de Busti
María Cristina Laurenz
María Elena Walsh
María Eugenia Estenssoro
María Julia Alsogaray
María Luisa Bemberg
María Martha Serra Lima
María Negroni
María Rosa Yorio
Mariana Anghileri
Mariano Moreno
Mariano Zabaleta
Mariela Antoniska
Mario Alberto Kempes
Mario Bravo
Mario Bunge
Mario Das Neves
Mario Davidovsky
Mario Garavaglia
Mario Palanti
Mario Pergolini
Mario Roberto Álvarez
Mario Roberto Santucho
Mario Rodríguez Cobos
Mario Sabato
Mariquita Sánchez de Thompson
Marta Minujín
Martha Argerich
Martina Stoessel
Martín de Álzaga
Martín Balza
Martín Fierro
Martín Fierro Awards
Martin Gramatica
Martín Jaite
Martín Lousteau
Martín Palermo
Martin Redrado
Martín Rodríguez
Martin Zapata High School
Massacre of Margarita Belén
Mate (beverage)
Mate cocido
Mate Cocido (outlaw)
Matías de Irigoyen
Matías Escobar
Mauricio Borensztein
Mauricio Kagel
Mauricio Macri
Mauricio Yedro
Mazorca
Mendoza Province
Mendoza
Mendoza River
Mendoza wine
Mercedes Lambre
Mercedes Sosa
Mercosur
Merlo, Buenos Aires
Metrotranvía of Mendoza
Metán Department
Merlo, San Luis
Mesopotamia, Argentina
Miguel Ángel Santoro
Miguel Juárez Celman
Miguel Najdorf
Miguel Rolando Covian
Military ranks of Argentina
Mimosa
Minas Department
Ministry of Defense (Argentina)
Mi noche triste
Miramar
Miramar, Córdoba
Miranda!
Mirtha Legrand
Misiones Province
Mocoví language
Mocoví people
Molinos Río de la Plata
Monte
Monte Fitz Roy
Monte Grande
Monteros
Montoneros
Moreno
Morón
Mort Cinder
Movement for Socialism
Munro
Museo de Artes Plásticas Eduardo Sívori
Museo Histórico Sarmiento
Museo Nacional de Aeronáutica de Argentina
Museo Provincial de Bellas Artes Timoteo Navarro
Music of Argentina

N

Nacha Guevara
Ñacuñán reservation
Nahuel Huapi National Park
Nahuel (tank)
Nahuelito
Napalpí massacre
Narciso Ibañez Menta
Natalia Oreiro
Natalio Pescia
National Atomic Energy Commission (CNEA)
National Autonomist Party
National Agricultural Technology Institute (INTA)
National Democratic Party (Argentina)
National Industrial Technology Institute (INTI)
National Reorganization Process
National Route 101 (Argentina)
National Route 105 (Argentina)
National Route 117 (Argentina)
National Route 118 (Argentina)
National Route 119 (Argentina)
National Route 12 (Argentina)
National Route 120 (Argentina)
National Route 121 (Argentina)
National Route 3 (Argentina)
National Route 9 (Argentina)
National Route A002 (Argentina)
National Route A003 (Argentina)
National Route A004 (Argentina)
National Route A005 (Argentina)
National Route A006 (Argentina)
National Route A007 (Argentina)
National Route A008 (Argentina)
National Route A009 (Argentina)
National Route A010 (Argentina)
National Route A011 (Argentina)
National Route A012 (Argentina)
National Route A014 (Argentina)
National Route A015 (Argentina)
National Route A019 (Argentina)
National Sea Festival
Nazareno Cruz y el lobo
Necessity and Urgency Decree
Nelly Beltrán
Néstor Gorosito
Néstor Kirchner
Neuquén People's Movement
Neuquén Province
Neuquén River
Neuquén
Newell's Old Boys
NH Gran Hotel Provincial
Nicolás Avellaneda
Nicolás del Campo
Nicolás Frutos
Nicolás Rodríguez Peña
Nicolino Locche
Nilda Garré
Nippur de Lagash
Nito Mestre
No. 164 Squadron RAF
Nogoyá
Nombre de Jesús (Patagonia)
Norah Lange
Norberto Menéndez
Norberto Osvaldo Alonso
Norma Aleandro
Norma Fontenla
Norman Briski
Ñancú (aircraft)
Ñorquincó Department
Ñorquincó
Nuevo Central Argentino

O

Obelisk of Buenos Aires
Occupation of the Falkland Islands
Ojos del Salado (volcano)
Olavarría
Olga Orozco
Oliden, Buenos Aires
Olimpo de Bahía Blanca
Oliverio Girondo
Olivos Pact
Olympic Garage
Ombú
Operación 90
Operación Masacre
Operation Charly
Operation Condor
Operation Mikado
Operativo Independencia
Orán, Salta
Orlando Barone
Orelie-Antoine de Tounens
Origin and history of the name of Argentina
Orquesta típica
Oscar Alemán
Oscar Alfredo Gálvez
Oscar Moro
Oscar Furlong
Oscar Pezzano
Osvaldo Álvarez Guerrero
Osvaldo Ardiles
Osvaldo Golijov
Osvaldo Lamborghini
Osvaldo Pugliese
Otto Meiling
Otto Krause
Otto Krause Technical School
Outline of Argentina

P

Pablo Alarcón
Pablo Bangardino
Pablo Batalla
Pablo Carballo
Pablo Echarri
Pablo Rojas Paz
Pablo Trapero
Pacho O'Donnell
Paco Jamandreu
Paco Urondo
Palacio Barolo
Página 12
Pajarito Gómez
Palacio San José
Palito Ortega
Pampa
Pampa (aircraft)
Panic of 1890
Paola Suárez
Paola Vukojicic
Paolo Goltz
Papal mediation in the Beagle conflict
Pappo
Para Ti
Paraguay River
Paraná River
Paraná Delta
Parque Chacabuco
Parque de la Independencia
Parque San Martín
Parque Patricios
Pascual Echagüe
Pascual Ruiz Huidobro
Patagon
Patagonia
Patagonia rebelde
Pato
Patricia Bullrich
Patricia Tarabini
Patricio Peralta Ramos
Patricio Rey y sus Redonditos de Ricota
Patrick Lynch
Paula Pareto
Paulina (film)
Pavón, Santa Fe
Pedro Aznar
Pedro Eugenio Aramburu
Pedro Giachino
Pedro Goyena
Pedro Laurenz
Pehuajó
Pelagio Luna
Pellegrini Lake
Pescado Rabioso
Pérez Celis
Perfil
Permanent Assembly for Human Rights
Peronist Youth
Pico Truncado
Picún Leufú Department
Picunches Department
Pilagá language
Pilar
Pilar Partido
Pinamar
Pinturas River
Pizzurno Palace
Plaza Dorrego
Plaza Huincul
Plaza Italia, Buenos Aires
Polish minority in Argentina
Politics of Argentina
Pontifical Catholic University of Argentina
Port of Rosario
Posadas
Postage stamps and postal history of Argentina
Potrero de los Funes
Poya (tribe)
Prensa Latina
Prilidiano Pueyrredón
Primera B Nacional Argentina
Primera Junta
Princess Máxima of the Netherlands
Provinces of Argentina
Pucará de Tilcara
Pucará (aircraft)
Puente del Inca
Puerto Bandera
Puerto Belgrano
Puerto Deseado
Puerto Iguazu
Puerto Madero
Puerto Madryn
Puerto Pirámides
Puerto San Julián
Puerto Santa Cruz
Pulqui I
Pulqui II
Purmamarca

Q

Quadrilateral Treaty
Quebrada de Humahuaca
Quequén Grande River
Quemú Quemú
Querandí
Quilmes
Quilmes Partido
Quilmes Rock
Quino

R

Racing Club de Avellaneda
Racing de Córdoba
Racism in Argentina
Radio Continental
Radio in Argentina
Rafael Calzada
Rafael de Sobremonte
Rafael Squirru
Rafael Obligado
Rafael Viñoly
Rafaela
Rail transport in Argentina
Railway Nationalisation in Argentina
Railway Privatisation in Argentina
Raimundo Ongaro
Ramallo massacre
Ramón Enrique Gaviola
Ramón Puerta
Rancul
Ranquel
Rapid Deployment Force (Argentina)
Raúl Alberto Lastiri
Raúl Alfonsín
Raúl de la Torre
Raúl Giménez
Raúl Scalabrini Ortiz
Raúl Prebisch
Real Audiencia of Buenos Aires
Realicó
Recoleta
Reconquista, Santa Fe
Regiment of Patricians
Reinaldo Alderete
René Favaloro
René Houseman
Renato Cesarini
Renault Torino
República Argentina
República Cromañón nightclub fire
Republiquetas
Resistencia
Revenue stamps of Argentina
Revolución Libertadora
Revolution of the Park
Revolution of the Restorers
Revolutionary Communist Party of Argentina
Rey Charol
Reynaldo Bignone
Riachuelo
Ricardo Brinzoni
Ricardo Darin
Ricardo Gareca
Ricardo Güiraldes
Ricardo Lavolpe
Ricardo López Murphy
Ricardo Obregón Cano
Ricardo Villa
Richard Gans
Richard Walther Darré
Río Atuel
Río Bermejo
Río Colorado
Río Cuarto
Río Cuarto (city)
Rio de la Plata
Rio Diamante
Río Gallegos
Río Grande
Río Iguazú
Río Negro
Río Negro Province
Río Pilcomayo
Río Primero
Río Segundo, Córdoba
Río Segundo Department
Río Tercero
Río Tercero (city)
Rivadavia de Lincoln
Robert Cox (journalist)
Roberto Abbondanzieri
Roberto Arlt
Roberto De Vicenzo
Roberto Fontanarrosa
Roberto Goyeneche
Roberto Grau
Roberto Lavagna
Roberto M. Levingston
Roberto Noble
Roberto Pettinato
Robledo Puch
Robustiano Patrón Costas
Roca-Runciman Treaty
Rodolfo Coria
Rodolfo Kuhn
Rodolfo Terragno
Rodolfo Walsh
Rodrigo de la Serna
Rojas
Rolando Schiavi
Romina Lanaro
Romina Tejerina
Romina Yan
Rómulo Sebastián Naón
Ronald Richter
Roque Pérez
Roque Sáenz Peña
Rosario, Santa Fe
Rosario Central
Rosario derby
Rosario Luchetti
Roque Ferreyra
Rubén Giustiniani
STV Royston Grange

S

Sabrina Sabrok
SAC-D
Saladillo River
Salado River
Salsa golf
Salta
Salta (ship)
Salvador María del Carril
Salvador Mazza
Samborombón Bay
Samborombón
Same-sex marriage in Argentina
Samuel Eichelbaum
San Antonio de Areco
San Antonio de los Cobres
San Carlos de Bariloche
San Carlos de Bolívar
San Carlos Department, Salta
San Clemente del Tuyú
SanCor
Sandra Mihanovich
Sandro de América
San Fernando del Valle de Catamarca
San Fernando, Buenos Aires
San Isidro
San Juan Province
San Juan
San Luis
San Luis Province
San Miguel, Buenos Aires
San Martín de los Andes
San Miguel de Tucumán
San Patricio Church massacre
San Roque Lake
San Salvador de Jujuy
Santa Cruz
Santa Fe
Santa Fe (S-11)
Santa Fe (S-21)
Santa Fe and Córdoba Great Southern Railway
Santa Rosa, La Pampa
Santa Teresita, Buenos Aires
Santiago de Liniers
Santiago del Estero
Santiago del Estero (S-12)
Santiago del Estero (S-22)
Santiago Derqui
Santiago Gentiletti
Santiago Llaver
Santos Laciar
Santos Lugares
Santos Vega
Sarandí
Sauce Viejo
Scotia Sea
Sergeant Kirk
Seasons in Argentine football
Sebastián Borensztein
Sebastián Dubarbier
Second Battle of Cancha Rayada
Segundo Cernadas
Selknam language
Selknam people
Senguerr River
Sergio Denis
Sergio Acevedo
Sergio Goycochea
Sergio and Javier Zanetti
Sergio Mulko
Serú Girán
Servicios Ferroviarios del Chaco
Servicios Ferroviarios Patagónico
Severino Di Giovanni
Siam di Tella
Sierra de La Ventana
Sierra de los Padres
Sierras de Córdoba
Silvia Quintela
Silvina Luna
Silvio Frondizi
Simoca
Sixto Casanovas
Skirmish at Many Branch Point
Snipe incident
Socialist Party (Argentina)
Sobre Heroes y Tumbas
Socompa
Soda Stereo
Sol Gabetta
Sol Líneas Aéreas
Soledad García
Soledad Pastorutti
Soledad Villamil
Sónoman
South America
South Atlantic Ocean
South Temperate Zone and Tropics
Southern Cone
Southern Hemisphere
South Orkney Islands
Southern right whale
Soy Luna
Spanish colonization of the Americas
Spanish language
Special Operations Forces Group
Spiritual Leader of the Nation of Argentina
State of Buenos Aires
State-owned Argentine Railway Companies
Strait of Magellan
Sui Generis
Superclásico
Supreme Director
Sur (tango)
Susana Blaustein Muñoz
Susana Calandrelli
Susana Giménez
Susana Rinaldi

T

Tactical Divers Group
Tacuara Nationalist Movement
Tafí del Valle
Tafí Viejo
Talleres de Córdoba
Talleres de Remedios de Escalada
Tandil
Tanti
Tanguito
Taki Ongoy
Tapiales
Tartagal
TC 2000 Championship
Teatro Colón
Tecka
Tehuelche language
Tehuelche people
Télam
Tereré
Termas de Río Hondo
Teodoro Bronzini
Textil Mandiyú
The ABC of Love
The Aleph and other short stories
The Hour of the Furnaces
The Invention of Morel
The Journey (1942 film)
The Journey (1992 film)
Theory of the two demons
The Secret in Their Eyes
The Terrace
Tía Vicenta
Tierra del Fuego
Tierra del Fuego Province
Tigre Club
Tigre Hotel
Tigre
Timeline of Argentine history
Tipica Tangarte
Toba
Tolhuin
Toay
Tomás Guido
Tomás Godoy Cruz
Tomás MacCormik
Topper (sports)
Torcuato de Alvear
Torcuato di Tella
Torcuato di Tella Institute
Tornquist
Tourism in Argentina
Traful lake
Traful River
Tragic Week
Transandine Railway
Transport in Argentina
Treaty of Benegas
Trelew
Trelew massacre
Trenque Lauquen
Tres Arroyos Partido
Tres Arroyos
Tres de Febrero
Tres Lagos
Trevelin
Trial of the Juntas
Triple A
Tronador (volcano)
Tropic of Capricorn
Tropics and South Temperate Zone
Truco
Truman (2015 film)
Tucumán Ferrocarriles
Tucumán
Tulio Halperín Donghi
Tunuyán
Tupungato
Turismo Carretera

U

Ubaldo Fillol Award
Ubaldo Matildo Fillol
Ubaldo Nestor Sacco
Uki Goñi
Ulises Dumont
Unidad de Gestión Operativa Ferroviaria de Emergencia
Unión de Santa Fe
Unitarian League
Unitarian Party
United Officers' Group
Universidad de Belgrano
Universidad de Buenos Aires
Universidad de Mendoza
Universidad del CEMA
Universidad del Salvador
Universidad Favaloro
Universidad Nacional de Córdoba
Universidad Nacional de Cuyo
Universidad Nacional de La Plata
Universidad Nacional de Rosario
Universidad Tecnológica Nacional
Universidad Torcuato di Tella
Un Guapo del 900
Uritorco
Uruguayan Invasion
Ushuaia

V

Valcheta
Valentín Alsina
Valeria Lynch
Valeria Mazza
Vanina Oneto
Veinticinco de Mayo, Buenos Aires Province
Veinticinco de Mayo class cruiser
Vicente Barbieri
Vicente López y Planes
Vicente López, Buenos Aires
Viceroyalty of the Río de la Plata
Víctor Galíndez
Víctor Heredia
Victoria Ocampo
Victorino de la Plaza
Viggo Mortensen
Viedma
Villa Carlos Paz
Villa Constitución
Villa Dálmine
Villa Devoto
Villa Fiorito
Villa Gesell
Villa Gobernador Gálvez
Villa La Angostura
Villa Lugano
Villa Luro
Villa Maria and Rufino Railway
Villa Paranacito
Villa Soldati
Villa Traful
Villa Tulumba
Violetta (telenovela)
Virginio Colombo
Virus (Argentine band)
Visa policy of Argentina
Vito Dumas
Vittorio Meano
VLEGA Gaucho

W

Waldo de los Ríos
Walter Samuel
Walter Vidarte
War of the Triple Alliance
Water privatization in Argentina
Water supply and sanitation in Argentina
Wbaldino Acosta
Welsh settlement in Argentina
Wikimedia Atlas of Argentina
William Brown (admiral)

Y

Yacimientos Petrolíferos Fiscales
Yavi
Yo maté a Facundo
Yo, Matías

Z

Zanja de Alsina
Zapala
Zapala Department
Zárate
Zárate-Brazo Largo Bridge
Zeta Bosio

See also

List of international rankings
Lists of country-related topics
Outline of Argentina
Outline of geography
Outline of South America
United Nations

External links

 
Indexes of topics by country